"VVS" is a song by South Korean rappers Mirani, Munchman, Khundi Panda, and Mushvenom. It was released on November 21, 2020, through Stone Music Entertainment. It peaked at number one on the Gaon Digital Chart for seven consecutive weeks and won Hip-hop Track of the Year at the Korean Hip-hop Awards.

A remix of the track, titled "VVS (H1ghr Remix)", was released on January 12, 2021, through H1ghr Music, Indigo Music, and Mushvenom. It was performed by pH-1, Big Naughty, Trade L, Woodie Gochild, Jay Park, and Kidd King.

Music and lyrics 
As VVS stands for very very slightly included on the diamond clarity scale, the rappers of "VVS" sing energetically about their lives that will shine bright like a diamond after overcoming hardship and failure. They wrote realistic lyrics that reflect young adults' fear for the future such as "Said I'll get you out of the bar / Girl at rock bottom / Mama's liquor bottles made me who I am / Hungry but I clench my teeth."

Awards and nominations 
"VVS" won Hip-hop Track of the Year at the Korean Hip-hop Awards. According to netizens, it is "an experimental track that has influence and persuasion" with "the clear presence of GroovyRoom's beat and the rappers' verses". It was also thought to be "a song that gave many people hope."

"VVS" was also nominated for Collaboration of the Year at KHA. According to netizens, it is "the best group song of the year proven by its amazing [music video] views." It was also described as an "attractive song that anyone who listens to hip-hop or watches Show Me the Money would know."

Charts

Weekly charts

Year-end charts

Certifications

References 

2020 songs
Gaon Digital Chart number-one singles
Korean Hip-hop Award-winning songs